Gaston Gérard chicken is a typical Burgundian dish.

Origin
This recipe was created for the first time in 1930 by the wife of the Mayor of Dijon, Gaston Gérard, for the French gastronomist, humorist and food critic Curnonsky.Bresse chicken is most often used.

History

Reine Geneviève Bourgogne, first wife of the Mayor of Dijon, was preparing a chicken in her usual way for the "prince of gastronomists". There was a serious incident in the kitchen which almost compromised the meal and the reputation of the hostess as a good cook. A jar of mustard (or paprika, but that spice is not in the recipe) fell into the casserole dish and spread out over the poultry as it cooked. Unable to get the condiment out, they added Burgundy white wine, crème fraîche and grated comté. This mixture pleased the famous gastronomic critic. He congratulated the mistress of the house for this recipe which he found strongly to his taste, and named it after his host. It is also known as Chicken Dijon.

Ingredients and preparation

The chicken is first browned in oil or butter, then left to cook. The sauce is made with the cooking juice, grated cheese, white wine from Burgundy, mustard, and cream. It is served slightly browned and paired with a white wine.

See also
 Burgundy Wine
 French cuisine

References

Further reading
 Patrick Rambourg, Histoire de la cuisine et de la gastronomie françaises, Paris, Ed. Perrin (coll. tempus n° 359), 2010, 381 pages. 
 Bryan Newman, "Behind the French Menu",

External links

Vin et cuisine (French Wiki - in French)
Cuisine bourguignonne (French Wiki - in French)

Culture of Burgundy
French cuisine